WONA-FM (95.1 FM) is a radio station licensed to serve the community of Vaiden, Mississippi. The station is owned by Sharon Kent and Susan Benning, through licensee Southern Electronics Co., Inc., and airs a country music format.

The station was assigned the call sign WZMS by the Federal Communications Commission on September 17, 2015. The station changed its call sign to WONA-FM on September 27, 2018.

References

External links
 Official Website
 FCC Public Inspection File for WONA-FM
 

ONA-FM
Radio stations established in 2018
2018 establishments in Mississippi
Country radio stations in the United States
Carroll County, Mississippi